A nonviolent revolution is a revolution conducted primarily by unarmed civilians using tactics of civil resistance, including various forms of nonviolent protest, to bring about the departure of governments seen as entrenched and authoritarian without the use or threat of violence. While many campaigns of civil resistance are intended for much more limited goals than revolution, generally a nonviolent revolution is characterized by simultaneous advocacy of democracy, human rights, and national independence in the country concerned.

An effective campaign of civil resistance, and even the achievement of a nonviolent revolution, may be possible in a particular case despite the government in power taking brutal measures against protesters. The commonly held belief that most revolutions that have happened in dictatorial regimes were bloody or violent uprisings is not borne out by historical analysis. Nonviolent Revolutions came to the international forefront in the 20th century by the independence movement of India under the leadership of Gandhi with civil disobedience being the tool of nonviolent resistance. Later it become more successful and more common in the 1980s as Cold War political alliances which supported status quo governance waned.

In the 1970s and 1980s, intellectuals in the Soviet Union and other Communist states, and in some other countries, began to focus on civil resistance as the most promising means of opposing entrenched authoritarian regimes. The use of various forms of unofficial exchange of information, including by samizdat, expanded. Two major revolutions during the 1980s strongly influenced political movements that followed. The first was the 1986 People Power Revolution in the Philippines, from which the term 'people power' came to be widely used, especially in Hispanic and Asian nations. Three years later, the Revolutions of 1989 that ousted communist regimes in the Eastern Bloc reinforced the concept (with the notable exception of the notoriously bloody Romanian Revolution), beginning with the victory of Solidarity in that year's Polish legislative elections. The Revolutions of 1989 provided the template for the so-called color revolutions in mainly post-communist states, which tended to use a color or flower as a symbol, somewhat in the manner of the Velvet Revolution in Czechoslovakia.

In December 1989, inspired by the anti-communist revolutions in Eastern Europe, the Mongolian Democratic Union (MDU) organized popular street protests and hunger strikes against the communist regime. In 1990, dissidents in the Azerbaijan Soviet Socialist Republic started civil resistance against the government, but were initially crushed by the Soviet Armed Forces in the Black January massacre.

Recent nonviolent revolutions include the Orange Revolution in Ukraine, which was highlighted by a series of acts of civil disobedience, sit-ins, and general strikes organized by the opposition movement.

Overview 

Historical examples of nonviolent resistance for significant political change go back as far as Ancient Rome.  The majority plebian class of Rome held general strikes and abandoned the city to force changes in the written constitution of the Republic. 

Nonviolent revolution was popularized in the 20th century by the satyagraha philosophy of Mahatma Gandhi, who guided the people of India to independence from Britain. Despite the violence of the Partition of India following independence, and numerous revolutionary uprisings which were not under Gandhi's control, India's independence was achieved through legal processes after a period of national resistance rather than through a military revolution.

According to the socialist Fourth International, Karl Marx acknowledged a theoretical possibility of "peaceful" revolutions, but the Fourth International articles also say "The development and preservation of good relations with the military forces is one of the absolute priorities of preparatory revolutionary work". Some have argued that a nonviolent revolution would require fraternisation with military forces, like in the relatively nonviolent
Portuguese Carnation Revolution.

Peaceful revolution 

A peaceful revolution or bloodless coup is an overthrow of a government that occurs without violence. If the revolutionists refuse to use violence, it is known as a nonviolent revolution. If the revolutionists are willing to use force, but the loyalists (government) negotiate or surrender to divert armed conflict, it is called a bloodless war.

Peaceful revolutions that have occurred are the Carnation Revolution of 1974 in Portugal, the People Power Revolution of 1986 in the Philippines, and the Peaceful Revolution of 1989 in Germany.

As it relates to democracy

One theory of democracy is that its main purpose is to allow peaceful revolutions. The idea is that majorities voting in elections approximate the result of a coup. In 1962, John F. Kennedy famously said, "Those who make peaceful revolution impossible will make violent revolution inevitable."

George Lakey in his 1973 book and in his 1976 "A Manifesto for Nonviolent Revolution", laid out a five-stage strategy for nonviolent revolution:

 Stage 1 – Cultural Preparation or "Conscientization": Education, training and consciousness raising of why there is a need for a nonviolent revolution and how to conduct a nonviolent revolution.
 Stage 2 – Building Organizations: As training, education and consciousness raising continues, the need to form organizations. Affinity groups or nonviolent revolutionary groups are organized to provide support, maintain nonviolent discipline, organize and train other people into similar affinity groups and networks.
 Stage 3 – Confrontation: Organized and sustained campaigns of picketing, strikes, sit-ins, marches, boycotts, die-ins, blockades to disrupt business as usual in institutions and government. By putting one's body on the line nonviolently the rising movement stops the normal gears of government and business.
 Stage 4 – Mass Non Cooperation: Similar affinity groups and networks of affinity groups around the country and world, engage in similar actions to disrupt business as usual.
 Stage 5 – Developing Parallel Institutions to take over functions and services of government and commerce. In order to create a new society without violence, oppression, environmental destruction, discrimination and one that is environmentally sustainable, nonviolent, democratic, equitable, tolerant, and fair, alternative organizations and structures including businesses must be created to provide the needed services and goods that citizens of a society need.

Gene Sharp, who influenced many in the Arab Spring revolutions, has documented and described over 198 different methods of nonviolent action that nonviolent revolutionaries might use in struggle. He argues that no government or institution can rule without the consent of the governed or oppressed as that is the source of nonviolent power. Mahatma Gandhi and Martin Luther King Jr. argued this as well.

List of nonviolent revolutions by era

Decolonization 
 1919 – March 1st Movement in Korea in an attempt to annul the Japan-Korea Treaty of 1910 and declare independence.
 1930 – Salt Satyagraha in India in an attempt to overthrow British colonial rule.
 1942 – Quit India movement demanding immediate independence for India from British rule.

Cold War

In nations of the Warsaw Pact 

 1968 – The Prague Spring, a period of political liberalization in Czechoslovakia.
The Revolutions of 1989: Even though many of these revolutions did not take place entirely in 1989, they are usually grouped together as such.
 1980–1989 – The Solidarity movement in April marshals popular resistance to communist rule, though progress is halted by the imposition of martial law.
 1987–1989/1991 – The Singing Revolution – a cycle of singing mass demonstrations, followed by a living chain across the Baltic states (Estonia, Lithuania, Latvia), known as the Baltic Way.
 1989 – The Peaceful Revolution in the German Democratic Republic leading to the fall of the Berlin Wall
 1989 – The Velvet Revolution – the bloodless revolution in Czechoslovakia leading to the downfall of the communist government there.
 1989 – The bloodless revolution in Bulgaria that resulted in the downfall of the communist government.
 1990 – The Golaniad – a protest in Romania in April by Bucharest students who demanded a non-communist government. The protests ended in bloodshed after an intervention of miners called in by President Ion Iliescu  (June 1990 Mineriad).
 The successful resistance to 1991 Soviet coup d'état attempt, which had the effect of a revolution, was mostly non-violent.

Outside of the Warsaw Pact 
 1952 – The Egyptian Revolution
 1969 – The al-Fateh Revolution in Libya
 1973 – The 1973 Afghan coup d'état in Afghanistan, which its leader called a White Revolution.
 1974 – The Carnation Revolution that effectively turned Portugal in a democracy.
 1986 – The People Power Revolution in the Philippines, where the term people power was coined. The nonviolent revolution led to the removal of dictator Ferdinand Marcos, the end of his 21-year regime, and the restoration of democracy in the Philippines.
 1990 – The Mongolian Revolution of 1990.

Post–Cold War period

Colour revolutions 

These are revolutions in post-communist authoritarian Europe and other new countries that were part of the former Soviet Union or Warsaw Pact. Each of these had massive street protests and/or followed disputed elections and led to the resignation or overthrow of leaders considered by their opponents to be authoritarian. Almost all of them used a particular colour or a flower to be their symbol of unity.

 2000 – The Bulldozer Revolution in Yugoslavia, which led to the overthrow of Slobodan Milošević. These demonstrations are considered by many to be the first example of the revolutions that followed in Georgia and Ukraine; however, the Serbs adopted an approach that had already been used in parliamentary elections in Slovakia and Croatia in 1998 and 2000, respectively, characterized by civic mobilization through get-out-the-vote campaigns and unification of the political opposition. The protesters in Serbia didn't adopt a colour or specific symbol (the most recognizable symbol of the revolution was a stylized fist), and despite the commonalities, many others refer to Georgia as the most definite beginning of the series of "colour revolutions." The demonstrations were supported by youth movement Otpor!.
 2003 – The Rose Revolution in Georgia, following the disputed 2003 Georgia legislative election, led to the overthrow of Eduard Shevardnadze and his replacement by Mikhail Saakashvili after new elections were held in March 2004. The Rose Revolution was supported by the civic resistance movement, Kmara.
 2004 – The Orange Revolution in Ukraine, followed the disputed second round of the 2004 presidential election and led to the annulment of the result and the repeat of the round—the leader of the opposition Viktor Yushchenko was declared President, defeating Viktor Yanukovych. The Orange Revolution was supported by PORA.
2018 - The Velvet Revolution in Armenia, which began with the nomination of President Serzh Sargsyan for the post of Prime Minister and against the ruling Republican Party of Armenia, achieved a non-violent transition of power to the opposition, which received widespread public support throughout the country. In elections to the National Assembly, held seven months after the resignation of the former leader, the party of the new government won 88% of the vote. However, it is not common to refer to it as a Colour Revolution, nor do its leaders use the term.

List of nonviolent revolutions by region

Middle East 
The media attention given to the color revolutions has inspired movements in the Middle East, and their supporters, to adopt similar symbology.

The Cedar Revolution in Lebanon followed the assassination of opposition leader Rafik Hariri in 2005. Chiefly, the movement demanded the withdrawal of Syrian troops from Lebanon, ending a de facto occupation. Unlike the revolutions in Eastern Europe and Central Asia, this movement did not seek to overturn disputed election results, but did cause the pro-Syrian government of Lebanon to fall. Due to similarities in motivation and organization strategies, it is considered a cousin of the colour revolutions.

Latin America 
Drawing inspiration from the People Power Revolution of 1986 in the Philippines, as well as other succeeding color revolution movements, several South American countries experienced what were effectively non-violent revolutions.

 Dominican Republic – "The Butterflies" or "Las Mariposas".  The Mirabal sisters fought to change their government, by underground movements. Also, by rejecting sexual advances from the president himself.  Three sisters were ordered to be killed by the president at the time, Rafael Trujillo, and only one survived to tell the story. There is also a movie made about their ordeal.
 Ecuador – The impeachment of President Lucio Gutiérrez, by the Congress of that country after days of increasing demonstrations and protests by citizens led by the citizens of Quito, the capital. Thousands of demonstrators were present in the Plaza of Independence. Flags were waved in celebration shortly after Congress voted out Gutierrez 62–0. Airport runways were blocked by demonstrators to prevent Gutierrez from leaving the country. The former president was later given asylum by Brazil and was transported out of the country on April 24. Protesters also intended to depose the Congress after accusing the body of alleged corruption as well.

Asia 
 South Korea – The June Struggle of 1987. It led to the end of military rule in South Korea and the establishment of democracy.
 Taiwan – The Wild Lily student movement of 1990.  Prior to the demonstrations, Taiwan was under one-party rule by the Kuomintang.  The student protesters demanded popular elections for the president and members of the National Assembly.  Previously, the National Assembly was dominated by representatives from provinces of mainland China who effectively held lifelong terms since the Republic of China could not hold elections in mainland China after the Kuomintang lost the Chinese Civil War.  President Lee Teng-hui, who was not a waishengren from mainland China, supported the students' goals and instituted constitutional reforms which effectively transformed Taiwan into a democracy.
 The Philippines – The Second EDSA Revolution of 2001, a four-day popular revolt that peacefully overthrew Philippine president Joseph Estrada in January 2001, self-organized through SMS messaging.

Current nonviolent resistance
Several countries are experiencing the rise of non-violent resistance movements with the intent of effecting a non-violent revolution.

Sudan
The Sudanese Revolution was a major shift of political power in Sudan that started with protests throughout the streets on 19 December 2018 and continued with sustained civil disobedience for about eight months, during which the 11 April 2019 Sudanese coup d'état deposed President Omar al-Bashir after thirty years in power, the 3 June Khartoum massacre took place under the leadership of the Transitional Military Council (TMC) that replaced al-Bashir, and in July and August 2019 the TMC and the Forces of Freedom and Change alliance (FFC) signed a Political Agreement and a Draft Constitutional Declaration legally defining a planned 39-month phase of transitional state institutions and procedures to return Sudan to a civilian democracy. In August and September 2019, the TMC formally transferred executive power to a mixed military–civilian collective head of state, the Sovereignty Council of Sudan, and to a civilian prime minister (Abdalla Hamdok) and a mostly civilian cabinet, while judicial power was apparently (according to Sudan Daily and Khartoum Star) transferred to Nemat Abdullah Khair, Sudan's first female Chief Justice.

Bahrain

Inspired by the regional Arab Spring, protests started in Bahrain on February 14. The government responded harshly, killing four protesters camping in Pearl Roundabout. Later, protesters were allowed to reoccupy the roundabout where they staged large marches amounting to 150,000 participants.

On March 14, Saudi-led GCC forces were requested by the government and entered the country, which the opposition called an "occupation". The following day state of emergency was declared and protests paused after a brutal crackdown was launched against protesters including doctors and bloggers. More than 2,929 people have been arrested, and at least five people died due to torture while in police custody.

Protests resumed after lifting emergency law on June 1, several large rallies were staged by the opposition parties including a march on March 9, 2012 attended by over 100,000. Smaller-scale protests and clashes outside of the capital have continued to occur almost daily. More than 80 people had died since the start of the uprising.

Belarus
There have been a number of protests against President Alexander Lukashenko, with participation from student group Zubr.  The most recent major protests were on March 25, 2005. This was a self-declared attempt to emulate the Kyrgyzstan revolution, and involved over a thousand citizens. However, it was severely suppressed by the police which arrested over 30 people.

Mikhail Marinich, a leader of the opposition, was arrested and placed in prison for 3.5 years.  The opposition uses as a symbol the white-red-white former flag of Belarus.  The movement has had significant connections with that in neighboring Ukraine, and during the Orange Revolution some white-red-white flags were seen being waved in Kiev.

Lukashenko has said in the past: "In our country, there will be no pink or orange, or even banana revolution." More recently he's said "They [the West] think that Belarus is ready for some 'orange' or, what is a rather frightening option, 'blue' or 'cornflower blue' revolution. Such 'blue' revolutions are the last thing we need". On April 19, 2005, he further commented: "All these coloured revolutions are pure and simple banditry."

Georgia
The 2007 Georgian demonstrations against the government of president Mikheil Saakashvili. The demonstrations peaked on November 2, 2007, when 50,000–100,000 rallied in downtown Tbilisi, capital of Georgia. Protests were organized by the National Council, an ad hoc coalition of ten opposition parties, and financed by the media tycoon Badri Patarkatsishvili. Demonstrations were initially largely peaceful, but turned violent the next day when the police used heavy-handed tactics, including tear gas and water cannon.

Moldova

The opposition in Moldova, is reported to have hoped and urged for some kind of Orange revolution, similar to that in Ukraine, in the followup of the 2005 Moldovan parliamentary elections, while the Christian Democratic People's Party adopted orange for its color in a clear reference to the events of Ukraine.

A name hypothesized for such an event was "grape revolution" because of the abundance of vineyards in the country; however, such a revolution failed to materialize after the governmental victory in the elections. Many reasons have been given for this, including a fractured opposition and that the government had already co-opted many of the political positions that might have united the opposition (such as a perceived pro-European and anti-Russian stance). Also, the elections themselves were declared fairer in the OSCE election monitoring reports than had been the case in other countries where similar revolutions occurred, even though the CIS monitoring mission strongly condemned them.

Mongolia
On March 25, 2005, activists wearing yellow scarves held protests in the capital city of Ulan Bator, disputing the results of the 2004 Mongolian parliamentary elections and calling for fresh elections. One of the chants heard in that protest was "Let's congratulate our Kyrgyz brothers for their revolutionary spirit. Let's free Mongolia of corruption."

Occupy Together
The Occupy movement is an international protest movement which started in New York City on September 17, 2011 with Occupy Wall Street and uses the occupation of public spaces without government permission as a means of protesting numerous issues, including notably social and economic inequality. By October 9 Occupy protests had taken place or were ongoing in over 95 cities across 82 countries and over 600 communities in the U.S. As of October 28 the Meetup page "Occupy Together" listed "Occupy" communities in 2,355 towns and cities worldwide.

Initiated by the Canadian activist group Adbusters, the movement is partly inspired by the Arab Spring movement, especially Cairo's Tahrir Square protests, and the Spanish Indignants. Occupy protests take their name from Occupy Wall Street, and commonly use the slogan We are the 99%, the #Occupy hashtag format, and organize through websites such as "Occupy Together" (website no longer being maintained).  The protests, which have been described as a "democratic awakening," are difficult to distill to a few demands, and have included protests against the Federal Reserve and clashes with local police over the right to camp out in public spaces.

Uzbekistan
There has been longstanding opposition to President Islam Karimov, from liberals and Islamists.  The revolution in neighboring Kyrgyzstan began in the largely ethnic Uzbek south, and received early support in the city of Osh. Nigora Hidoyatova, leader of the Free Peasants opposition party, has referred to the idea of a farmers' revolution. She also said that her party is collaborating with the youth organization Shiddat, and that she hopes it can evolve to an organization similar to Kmara or PORA.

See also
Peaceful transition of power
Social defence
1908 Venezuelan coup d'état

References

External links
 peace news – for nonviolent revolution
 How to Start a Revolution, documentary directed by Ruaridh Arrow
 Right to Nonviolence
 Nonviolent Social Change – the Bulletin of the Manchester College Peace Studies Institute- a journal on nonviolent social change
Nonviolent Resistance, Reform, & Revolution ~ Civil Rights Movement Archive (U.S.)
12 Lessons in Nonviolent Resistance from the 1989 student occupation of Beijing's Tienanmen Square (2014-06-09), Chris Hedges, Truthdig

 
Anarcho-pacifism